Enigma is the third album by British progressive metal group Aeon Zen. Reviews were generally positive, with AltSounds calling the musicianship "stunning". The album made some departures from the band's previous sounds, with Fireworks magazine noting that "Divinity and Eternal Snow have bursts of growly vocals on the heavier parts", but in spite of this, Prog still deemed there to be an "overwhelming sense of cohesion on this record". Metal Hammer seconded this opinion noting the way that "those theoretically disparate stylistic stands combine to create something that thrums with vitality and a laudable devotion to making music that impresses and resonates".

Track listing

Personnel
Rich Hinks – Vocals, Guitar, Bass, Keyboards, Drums, Alto Saxophone, Producer, Mixing, Mastering
Andi Kravljaca – Vocals
Matt Shepherd – Guitar
Shaz – Keyboards
Steve Burton – Drums
Nate Loosemore – Guest Vocals
Atle Pettersen – Guest Vocals
Jonny Tatum – Guest Vocals
Mattias Norén – Artwork

References

2013 albums
Aeon Zen albums